, son of regent Norizane, was a kugyō or Japanese court noble of the Kamakura period. He held regent positions kampaku from 1273 to 1274 and  sessho in 1274.

Family
 Father: Kujō Norizane
 Mother: Fujiwara Yuko
 Wife and Children:
 Wife: Sanjō Kinfusa’s daughter
 Kujō Tadatsugu (1253-?)
 Kujō Tadanori
 Shincho （1266 - 1322）
 Unknown
 Jicho
 Jinkei
 Seikei
 Kakuei
 ??? (隆信)

References

 

1229 births
1275 deaths
Fujiwara clan
Kujō family
People of Kamakura-period Japan